Douglas Parks Greene (born February 10, 1956) is a former American football defensive back who played three seasons for the St. Louis Cardinals and Buffalo Bills. He also played two seasons in the United States Football League for the Washington Federals and San Antonio Gunslingers.

Early life and education
Doug Greene was born on February 10, 1956, in Los Angeles, California. He went to high school at Yates High School. He went to college at Texas A&M-Kingsville.

Professional career
St. Louis Cardinals

Greene was drafted in the 3rd round (69th overall) in the 1978 NFL draft. He played in 15 out of 16 games in his rookie season. He also started 4 games. He went to the Buffalo Bills the next season.

Buffalo Bills

With the Buffalo Bills in 1979, he had his first and only career interception; a 21-yard return. He played 15 games for the Bills. The next year he only played in 8 games.

Washington Federals

After not playing in 1981 or 1982, he played a season in 1983 with the Washington Federals of the United States Football League. He had 9 interceptions for 121 yards and a touchdown. He also had a 5-yard sack. He played in all 18 games.

San Antonio Gunslingers

In 1984, he played for the San Antonio Gunslingers. 1984 was his last season.

References

1956 births
Living people
St. Louis Cardinals (football) players
Buffalo Bills players
American football cornerbacks
Texas A&M–Kingsville Javelinas football players